Octave Hamelin (22 July 1856 in Montpellier – 11 September 1907 in Prades, Pyrénées-Orientales) was a French philosopher. He taught as a professor at the University of Bordeaux (1884-) and the University of Sorbonne (1905-). Hamelin was a close friend of the sociologist Émile Durkheim, with whom he shared an interest in the French philosopher Charles Renouvier.  He is also known as a translator of classical Greek philosophers.

Literary works
 Essai sur le éléments principaux de la représentation, 1907
 Le système de Descartes, 1911
 Le système d'Aristote, 1920 (edited by L. Robin)
 Le Système de Renouvier, 1927 (published by P. Mouy)

1856 births
1907 deaths
Academic staff of the University of Bordeaux
Academic staff of the University of Paris
French philosophers
French male non-fiction writers